The Women's duet event at the 2016 Summer Olympics in Rio de Janeiro, Brazil, took place at the Maria Lenk Aquatics Center from 14 to 16 August.

The preliminary phase consisted of a free routine, then a technical routine with required elements. The scores from the two routines were added together and the top twelve duets qualified for the final.

The final repeated the same free routine and the score from the final free routine was added to the score from the preliminary technical routine to decide the overall winners.

The medals were presented by Nicole Hoevertsz, IOC member, Aruba and Qiuping Zhang, Bureau Member of FINA.

Qualification 

A total of twenty four duets qualified for the event. The eight National Olympic Committees (NOC) qualified for the team competition were automatically awarded a place for duets. The five best ranked NOCs in each of the continental championships who had not qualified for team event were also awarded a place each. The eleven remaining places were awarded through an Olympic Games qualification tournament, held in Rio at the Maria Lenk Aquatics Center 02-06 March 2016.

Schedule

Start list 
Both preliminary free and technical routines starting lists were decided by random draw. For the final however, two groups were made: the last six and the first six qualified duets, the former group starting first. Within each group, the best qualified started first (meaning the seventh qualified started first and the first started seventh) with the remaining duets decided by random draw within the group.

Results

Qualification

Final

References

2016
2016 in women's sport
Synch